is a Japanese actress and singer. She was a fifth-generation member of the Japanese pop group Morning Musume. She joined Morning Musume in 2001 along with 3 others- Ai Takahashi, Asami Konno and Makoto Ogawa. She grew up in Yokohama after moving there at the age of six. She was one of the longest serving members of Morning Musume, and was the leader of the group from October 2011 to her graduation on May 18, 2012.

Biography

History

Niigaki was born in Yokohama, Kanagawa. She was the runner-up for the 'Kiss Girl Audition' in becoming the Tomy image girl before joining Morning Musume. She appeared with the winner Ai Hasegawa in a Tomy Karaoke Machine commercial.

In 2001, Niigaki joined Morning Musume as the fifth generation along with Ai Takahashi, Asami Konno, and Makoto Ogawa. Morning Musume producer Tsunku said he chose Niigaki because she "shined during the final studio recording" for the audition song that all the finalists had to sing. She debuted and lead on the group's 13th single, "Mr. Moonlight (Ai no Big Band)" making her one of the few members of Morning Musume who was able to lead on her debut single. She first appeared in their 4th album, 4th Ikimasshoi!. In the summer of that year, she also debuted in a shuffle unit as part of Happy 7, with two other members of her generation (Ai Takahashi and Makoto Ogawa).

Later in September, all fifth-generation members were placed into subgroups. Niigaki was placed into Tanpopo as a member of the third generation, along with Asami Konno. The new line-up only released one single before becoming inactive.

Niigaki, along with many other members of Morning Musume at that time, starred in a drama entitled Angel Hearts which was released in 2002. In 2003, she was placed into Sakuragumi, which released two singles before also becoming inactive.

In early 2007, Niigaki was chosen to be a member of the  along with Kaori Iida, Natsumi Abe, Maki Goto and Koharu Kusumi - a unit created to celebrate Morning Musume's 10th anniversary. Their first single, was released on January 24, 2007. On June 1, 2007, Miki Fujimoto's resigned from Morning Musume, Ai Takahashi replaced Fujimoto as leader, while Risa Niigaki took Takahashi's place as sub-leader.

Following the announcement of Nozomi Tsuji's pregnancy, Niigaki took over Tsuji's role as Athena in the animation series Robby & Kerobby.  In October 2007, Niigaki was placed in the unit Athena & Robikerottsu along with fellow Morning Musume member Aika Mitsui, as well as Saki Nakajima and Chisato Okai of Cute.

It then was announced in July 2008 that Niigaki and Ai Takahashi would play the 70s idol J-pop duo Pink Lady in the TV drama Hitmaker Aku Yū Monogatari. From August 6 until August 25, 2008, Morning Musume performed a version of Rodgers and Hammerstein's Cinderella with the Takarazuka Revue, in which Niigaki starred as the Prince. On February 12, 2009, it was announced that Morning Musume would be performing in the United States at the 2009 Anime Expo, the nation's largest anime convention, as one of the first official guests of honor. In an interview Niigaki stated that "The movies that Disney makes are full of dreams, but when I have children, I'd like them to know about war, the pain of death and such things, so I hope they will watch [anime]." Niigaki also revealed that her favorite anime was Sailor Moon, stating that "we copied the hairstyles and had a 'Sailor Moon' playhouse in kindergarten." Niigaki became one of four members to remain in Morning Musume for seven years or more (the others being Kaori Iida, Hitomi Yoshizawa, and fellow fifth-generation member Ai Takahashi). Niigaki and Takahashi became the longest-serving members in Morning Musume history, on January 17, 2009, breaking the four-year-old record set by Kaori Iida. Later in August, Niigaki and Takahashi became the first members to remain in Morning Musume for eight years. Niigaki was later assigned to be a part of the new shuffle group ZYX-α with Koharu Kusumi, Maasa Sudo, Momoko Tsugunaga, Erika Umeda, Chinami Tokunaga, Saki Ogawa, and Ayaka Wada.

On January 9, 2011, it was announced that Ai Takahashi would graduate from Morning Musume and Hello! ProjectHello! A project at the end of their autumn 2011 concert tour. Niigaki would take over the position as leader of Morning Musume after Takahashi's graduation. After Takahashi's graduation, Niigaki became the only member of Hello! Project that had joined before the Hello! Project Kids, and holds the record for the longest-serving member of Morning Musume and Hello! Project.

She would graduate from Morning Musume and Hello! Project on the last day of their Spring Concert Tour, May 18, at Nippon Budokan. Niigaki was the fourth Morning Musume member to graduate at the Budokan. On May 18, 2012, Niigaki graduated from Morning Musume and Hello! Project alongside Aika Mitsui. She handed down her position as leader of Morning Musume to Sayumi Michishige.

Personal life

Niigaki began dating Yoshikazu Kotani after starring together in the stage play Absolute Boyfriend in 2013. After two years of dating, they held their marriage ceremony on July 11, 2016. On January 6, 2018, both announced on their blogs that they were filing for divorce, citing they were growing apart.

On June 30, 2022, Niigaki announced that she is remarried with a YouTube cinematographer Yasutake Yamaguchi.

Releases

Photobooks

DVDs 
 2007-06-13 – 
 2009-01-21 – 
 2010-07-14 –

Acts

Movies 
 2002 – 
 2003 –

Dramas 
 2002 – Angel Hearts
 2002 – 
 2008 – Hitmaker Aku Yū Monogatari as Kei from Pink Lady

Television shows

Radio

References

External links 
 Official Blog
 Morning Musume: Official Hello! Project profile 

1988 births
7Air members
Happy 7 members
Japanese female idols
Japanese stage actresses
Japanese voice actresses
Japanese women pop singers
21st-century Japanese women singers
21st-century Japanese singers
Japanese child singers
Japanese child actresses
Living people
Morning Musume members
Tanpopo members
People from Yokohama
Musicians from Kanagawa Prefecture